The Prayer Pilgrimage for Freedom, or Prayer Pilgrimage to Washington, was a 1957 demonstration in Washington, D.C., an early event in the Civil Rights Movement of the 1950s and 1960s. It was the occasion for Martin Luther King Jr.'s Give Us the Ballot speech.

Background
The demonstration was planned to mark the third anniversary of the Brown v. Board of Education (1954), a landmark Supreme Court decision ruling that segregation in public schools was unconstitutional. The event organizers urged the government to implement that decision, as the process of desegregation was being obstructed in much of the South at local and state levels.

The march was organized by A. Philip Randolph, Bayard Rustin, and Ella Baker. It was supported by the NAACP and the recently founded Southern Christian Leadership Conference. Congressman Adam Clayton Powell Jr. (D-NY) had asked the planners to avoid embarrassing the Republican Dwight D. Eisenhower administration, and they organized the event as a prayer commemoration. A call for the demonstration was issued on April 5, 1957, by Randolph, Martin Luther King Jr., and Roy Wilkins. According to King, Walter Reuther, president of the United Auto Workers, sent letters to all of his local unions, requesting members to attend the march and provide financial support.

Demonstration
The three-hour demonstration was held in front of the Lincoln Memorial on the Mall. Mahalia Jackson and Harry Belafonte participated in the event. Paul Robeson and his wife Eslanda attended, but were largely ignored. Among the speakers were Wilkins, Mordecai Johnson, and King. King was the last speaker and it was the first time that he addressed a national audience. He identified restoration and enforcement of voting rights for blacks as an important part of the civil rights struggle. About 25,000 demonstrators attended the event to pray and voice their opinion. At the time, the event was the largest demonstration ever organized for civil rights.

"Give Us the Ballot"

King's speech is referred to as Give Us the Ballot, as he repeated this demand as a litany, followed by a listing of changes that would result by African Americans regaining voting rights: 
 

It is one of King's major speeches.

Results
With this speech, King established himself as the "No. 1 leader of 16 million Negroes," according to James L. Hicks, of the Amsterdam News). His call for the ballot eventually helped inspire such events as the Selma Voting Rights Movement, its related Selma to Montgomery March, and the 1965 Voting Rights Act. The organizers gained experience and the march laid the foundation for additional, larger Civil Rights Movement demonstrations in Washington.

See also

 Sermons and speeches of Martin Luther King Jr.

References

External links
 Prayer Pilgrimage for Freedom, Washington, D.C., Civil Rights Digital Library.

1957 in Washington, D.C.
May 1957 events in the United States
History of African-American civil rights
History of civil rights in the United States
History of voting rights in the United States
Movements for civil rights
Nonviolent resistance movements
Protest marches in Washington, D.C.
Speeches by Martin Luther King Jr.
1957 protests